Below is a list of current rosters of teams from ABA League Second Division.

There are a total of 14 teams in the Second Division for the 2020–21 season.

Borac Banja Luka

Gorica

Helios Suns

Krka

Pelister

Podgorica

Sloga

Spars Ilidža

Sutjeska

GDD Šenčur

Široki

TFT Skopje

Vrijednosnice Osijek

Zlatibor

See also 
 List of current ABA League First Division team rosters
 List of current Basketball League of Serbia team rosters

External links
Second Division Official Website